The Women's Slalom LW10 was one of the events held in Alpine skiing at the 1988 Winter Paralympics in Innsbruck.

There were 3 competitors in the final.

Switzerland's Francoise Jacquerod set a time of 2:19.79, taking the gold medal. Since only Jacquerod finished the race, she was the only winner of a medal.

Results

Final

References 

Slalom
Para